Pizzo Fiorèra (also known as Bedriolhorn) is a mountain of the Lepontine Alps on the Swiss-Italian border. It is located south of the Basòdino, on the chain that separates the Italian Val Formazza from the Swiss Val Bavona.

References

External links
 Pizzo Fiorèra on Hikr

Mountains of the Alps
Mountains of Switzerland
Mountains of Piedmont
Mountains of Ticino
Lepontine Alps
Italy–Switzerland border
International mountains of Europe